Ezri Ngoyo Konsa (born 23 October 1997) is an English professional footballer who plays as a central defender for Premier League club Aston Villa. He came through the academy at Charlton Athletic and later joined Brentford and Aston Villa. Konsa has played for England at youth level, winning the 2017 FIFA U-20 World Cup with England U20 and the 2018 Toulon Tournament with England U21.

Club career

Charlton Athletic
A central defender, Konsa began his career with Senrab and joined Charlton Athletic at the age of 11. He began a scholarship in July 2014 and progressed sufficiently to sign a "long term" professional contract on 11 December 2015. Eight days later, he received his maiden call into the first team squad for a Championship match versus Burnley and remained an unused substitute during the 4–0 defeat. Konsa was an unused substitute on one further occasion during the 2015–16 season, which culminated in the Addicks' relegation to League One.

Konsa broke into the first team squad during the 2016–17 pre-season and made his professional debut with a start in a 1–0 EFL Cup first round defeat to Cheltenham Town on 9 August 2016. He was a regular throughout the 2016–17 season and finished the campaign with 39 appearances. He also showed his versatility by deputising in midfield and at full back. For his efforts, Konsa was named the club's Young Player of the Year. He signed a new three-year contract in March 2017 and was again a regular during the 2017–18 season, making 47 appearances as Charlton reached the League One play-off semi-finals. He departed Charlton Athletic in June 2018, having made 86 appearances during two-and-a-half seasons as a professional at The Valley.

Brentford
On 12 June 2018, Konsa moved across London to join Championship club Brentford on a three-year contract, with a one-year option, for an undisclosed fee, reported to be £2.5 million. He was a first-choice in central defence throughout the 2018–19 season and he scored the first senior goal of his career in a 3–0 victory over Preston North End on the final day.

Aston Villa
On 11 July 2019, Konsa moved to newly promoted Premier League club Aston Villa, for an undisclosed fee. The move reunited Konsa with Dean Smith, who signed him for Brentford one year earlier, and Richard O'Kelly. He scored on his debut for Villa in an EFL Cup tie against Crewe Alexandra on 27 August 2019.
On 21 January 2020, Konsa assisted Tyrone Mings to set up the winning goal in a 2–1 victory against Watford. He scored his first Premier League goal on 16 July 2020, in a 1–1 away draw at Everton.

On 2 April 2021, Konsa signed a contract extension with Aston Villa until 2026. On 5 December 2021, Konsa scored twice in a 2–1 Premier League victory over Leicester City, becoming the first defender to score twice in a Premier League match for Aston Villa since 2010.

On 15 May 2022, Konsa suffered a serious knee injury in a home game against Crystal Palace. Scans confirmed, that although Konsa would miss the remaining two games of the 2021–22 season, he was expected to be fit again in August or September of 2022.

International career

U20
Konsa was a member of the England squad that won the 2017 FIFA U-20 World Cup with his only appearance of the tournament coming as a 93rd minute substitute during the 3–1 semi-final victory over Italy.

U21 
Konsa was named in the U21 squad for the 2018 Toulon Tournament and made two appearances. He was an unused substitute during the 2–1 victory over Mexico in the Final. Konsa scored his first international goal on his fourth cap, in a 7–0 2019 European U21 Championship qualifying win over Andorra on 11 October 2018. He was named in the squad for the tournament finals, but made just one appearance, as a substitute in the Young Lions' dead rubber final group stage match.

Personal life 
Konsa was born to a Congolese (DRC) father and an Angolan mother. He is also eligible for Portuguese citizenship.

He attended Cumberland Sports College 
and is a boyhood Tottenham Hotspur supporter.

Career statistics

Honours
Aston Villa
EFL Cup runner-up: 2019–20

England U20
FIFA U-20 World Cup: 2017

England U21
Toulon Tournament: 2018

Individual
Charlton Athletic Young Player of the Year: 2016–17

References

External links

Ezri Konsa at brentfordfc.com
Ezri Konsa at thefa.com

1997 births
Living people
Footballers from the London Borough of Newham
English footballers
England youth international footballers
England under-21 international footballers
Association football defenders
Senrab F.C. players
Charlton Athletic F.C. players
Brentford F.C. players
Aston Villa F.C. players
English Football League players
Premier League players
Black British sportspeople
English people of Angolan descent
English sportspeople of African descent
English sportspeople of Democratic Republic of the Congo descent